Cleretum is a genus of flowering plants in the family Aizoaceae, native to the Cape Provinces of South Africa.

Taxonomy
The genus Cleretum was erected by Nicholas Edward Brown in 1925. He published the name in a key, basing the diagnosis on a herbarium sheet that was discovered to contain parts belonging to plants in different genera and without designating a type. This caused confusion as to whether the genus had been validly published and whether genus names published later were synonyms or not. It was established in 1985 that Cleretum was validly published, and that Micropterum was a later synonym. Cleretum papulosum was designated as the type species. Cleretum is placed in the tribe Dorotheantheae. A study in 2012 concluded that the genera previously separated in the Dorotheantheae did not differ sufficiently to be recognized, and placed them all in Cleretum, now the only genus in the tribe.

Species
, Plants of the World Online accepted the following species:

Cleretum apetalum (L.f.) N.E.Br.
Cleretum bellidiforme (Burm.f.) G.D.Rowley
Cleretum booysenii (L.Bolus) Klak
Cleretum bruynsii Klak
Cleretum clavatum (Haw.) Klak
Cleretum herrei (Schwantes) Ihlenf. & Struck
Cleretum hestermalense (Ihlenf. & Struck) Klak
Cleretum lyratifolium Ihlenf. & Struck
Cleretum maughanii (N.E.Br.) Klak
Cleretum papulosum (L.f.) N.E.Br.
Cleretum patersonjonesii Klak
Cleretum pinnatifidum (L.f.) N.E.Br.
Cleretum rourkei (L.Bolus) Klak

References

Aizoaceae genera
Aizoaceae
Taxa named by N. E. Brown
Succulent plants